New Providence Presbyterian Church may refer to:

New Providence Presbyterian Church (Salvisa, Kentucky), listed on the National Register of Historic Places in Mercer County, Kentucky
New Providence Presbyterian Church (Brownsburg, Virginia), listed on the National Register of Historic Places in Rockbridge County, Virginia